Eliška Sonntagová (born 26 July 2001) is a Czech footballer who plays as a midfielder for Sparta Praha and has appeared for the Czech Republic women's national team.

Sonntagová was voted talent of the year at the 2019 Czech Footballer of the Year (women).

Career
Sonntagová has been capped for the Czech Republic national team, appearing for the team during the UEFA Women's Euro 2021 qualifying cycle.

References

External links
 
 
 

2001 births
Living people
Czech women's footballers
Czech Republic women's international footballers
Women's association football midfielders
AC Sparta Praha (women) players
Czech Women's First League players